Markhuri Sanders-Frison (born June 15, 1988) is a retired American professional basketball player. He played college basketball for the California Golden Bears before playing professionally in Mexico, Australia, and Japan. He last played for Aisin AW Areions Anjo. 

As of 2022, Sanders-Frison serves as graduate manager for the Oregon Ducks men's basketball program.

A 2011 graduate of the University of California, Berkeley, Sanders-Frison was starting center for the 2010 team that led the program to its first conference title since 1960.

Career statistics 

|-
|  align="left" | 2013-14
| align="left" | Tokyo Ex
|32 ||32 || 27.9 ||.573  || .333 ||.472  || bgcolor="CFECEC"| 15.2* || 1.8 || 1.0 ||0.5  || 15.4
|-
|  align="left" | 2014-15
| align="left" | Tokyo Ex
|31 ||30 ||30.1 ||.614  || .000 ||.553  ||  bgcolor="CFECEC"|15.9* || 1.8 || 1.2 ||0.3  ||22.5
|-
|  align="left" | 2015-16
| align="left" | Osaka
|22 ||7 ||18.4 ||.449  || .000 ||.469  || 8.0 || 1.5 || 0.6 ||0.5  ||6.3
|-
|  align="left" | 2016-17
| align="left" | Yamagata
|45 ||39 ||23.0 ||.501  || .167 ||.571  || 10.4 || 1.4 || 0.5 ||0.6  ||12.6
|-
| style="background-color:#FFCCCC" align="left" | 2017-18
| align="left" | Iwate Big Bulls
|46 ||34 || 25.6 ||.474  || .000 ||.580  || 9.6 || 2.8 || 0.7 ||0.2  || 11.1
|-

References

1988 births
Living people
Aisin AW Areions Anjo players
American expatriate basketball people in Australia
American expatriate basketball people in Japan
American expatriate basketball people in Mexico
Fuerza Guinda de Nogales players
Iwate Big Bulls players
Osaka Evessa players
Passlab Yamagata Wyverns players
Yokohama Excellence players
Sun Rockers Shibuya　players
Basketball players from Portland, Oregon
American men's basketball players
Power forwards (basketball)